Alexander Faulkner Shand FBA (20 May 1858 – 6 January 1936) was an English writer and barrister.  Born in Bayswater, London, he was the son of Hugh Morton Shand, a Scot (grandson of William Shand, 2nd Laird of Craigellie), and his wife Edrica Faulkner, the Italian-born daughter of Joshua Wilson Faulkner of Kent.  He was a founding member of the British Psychological Society in 1901 and was awarded with honorary membership in 1934.  He was elected a Fellow of the British Academy (FBA). 

He lived at 1 Edwardes Place, Kensington, London.

Through his son Philip, he is the patrilineal great-grandfather of Camilla, Queen Consort.

References

 'SHAND, Alexander Faulkner', Who Was Who, A & C Black, 1920–2008; online edn, Oxford University Press, Dec 2007 accessed 30 Jan 2012

1858 births
1936 deaths
English writers
English lawyers
English barristers
Writers from London
Alexander
Anglo-Scots
Fellows of the British Academy
Founders of the British Psychological Society